Marcelo Augusto David (born 31 October 1994), better known as coldzera, is a Brazilian professional Counter Strike: Global Offensive player for 00 Nation. He was named the best CS:GO player in both 2016 and 2017 by CS:GO news website HLTV.

Career
In August 2015, coldzera was signed by the Luminosity Gaming team, his first contract. His first tournament for the new team was ESL One Cologne 2015, where he managed to get his team through the group stage to reach the quarterfinals of the tournament, but they were eliminated by the Swedish team FNATIC.  
  
In 2016, they managed to get out of the group stage in every tournament they participated in, bar one, and including two finals. However, it was not until April that they were able to win their first tournament, MLG Columbus 2016. This resulted in a prize of $500,000 for the team and $100,000 for coldzera personally. This was the first tier 1 championship in which a Brazilian won the MVP (Most Valuable Player) for the tournament, and it was coldzera who won it. Subsequently, his team won two more tournaments for the Luminosity organization; DreamHack Austin and ESL Pro League Season 3. The team's last tournament for the organization was ECS Season 1, where they were second, losing to the G2 Esports team. In July 2016 the five players who played for Luminosity Gaming were hired by the organization SK Gaming.

The team's first championship for the new organization was ESL One: Cologne 2016 in July, just days after the acquisition by SK Gaming was announced. Again, the team managed to take first place, becoming a two-time Major championship roster, a feat that only the Swedish Fnatic team and the French Team EnVyUs core lineup had ever achieved (the former being the only ones to win two majors in a row before the Brazilians, and the latter winning DreamHack Winter 2014 as LDLC and DreamHack Open Cluj-Napoca as EnVyUs). coldzera again took the championship MVP award.
By putting in amazing performances coldzera was ranked as HLTV's best player consecutively in the years 2016 and 2017.

On June 23, 2018, coldzera, Fer, FalleN, Stewie2K and boltz were signed by Made In Brazil, with a lineup that had only formed shortly before moving to the new team, with boltz and Stewie2k replacing TACO (who went to Team Liquid) and felps. Without much success, tarik joined the team and boltz left the team, but even still with this lineup, cold and his team only won the 2018 ZOTAC Cup Masters, and did not achieve expected levels of performance. Then, on 21/12/2018, the organization announced the return of TACO, felps and zews. And with this line, coldzera stood out individually, but that was not enough to yield great achievements as his team did not work collectively, but this individual highlight earned him the tenth position in the top 20 best players in the world in 2018, according to HLTV.org.

On July 12, 2019, it was confirmed by MIBR that coldzera would go to the team bench and zews would provisionally take his place, eventually playing the major in Germany. On September 25, coldzera officially left MIBR and was transferred to FaZe Clan.
Notable tournament victory for coldzera after joining FaZe clan was winning the BLAST Pro Series Copenhagen 2019.

Awards and recognition

 Was voted the best player of 2016 by HLTV.org.
 Was voted the best player of 2017 by HLTV.org.
 Was voted the 10th best player of 2018 by HLTV.org.
 Was voted the MVP of 8 different tournaments, including 2 Major MVPs.

References

External links
Facebook
Instagram
Twitter
ESEA
Faceit
Twitch

1994 births
Living people
Counter-Strike players
Brazilian esports players
FaZe Clan players
Twitch (service) streamers